Hipsheim is a commune in the southeast of the Bas-Rhin department in Alsace in north-eastern France.

Hipsheim is located some ten kilometres (six miles) to the south of Strasbourg.

Landmarks
 The 18th century church of Saint Ludan has a 13th century tower near to the departmental road RD1083 (formerly RD 83)
 The Chapel of Saint Wendelin.

See also
 Communes of the Bas-Rhin department

References

Communes of Bas-Rhin
Bas-Rhin communes articles needing translation from French Wikipedia